Mónika Császár (born 17 November 1954) is a retired Hungarian gymnast. She competed at the 1972 Summer Olympics in all artistic gymnastics events and won a bronze medal in the team competition. Her best individual result was fourth place on the balance beam. She won another bronze team medal at the 1974 World Artistic Gymnastics Championships.

She married András Balczó, an Olympic pentathlete.

References

1954 births
Hungarian female artistic gymnasts
Living people
Gymnasts from Budapest
Gymnasts at the 1972 Summer Olympics
Olympic gymnasts of Hungary
Olympic bronze medalists for Hungary
Olympic medalists in gymnastics
Medalists at the 1972 Summer Olympics
Medalists at the World Artistic Gymnastics Championships
20th-century Hungarian women
21st-century Hungarian women